Al-Khattab ibn al-Hasan ibn Abi'l-Hifaz was a warrior, poet and theologian, who became Dhu'ayb ibn Musa's principal aide, and an important asset to the Sulayhid dynasty and Tayyibi Isma'ilism cause, until his murder by his nephews in a dispute over control of al-Hajur in 1138. Al-Khattab was succeeded as chief assistant (maʾdhūn) by Ibrahim ibn al-Husayn al-Hamidi.

Life
al-Khattab was milk brother to Arwa al-Sulayhi and chief of the tribe of Hajur from Qodam in Hamdaan. During the time of Arwa al-Sulayhi, he faced challenges from his brother Sulaiman. Al-Khattab finally went to battle against him and in one of the encounters, Sulaiman was killed.

al-Khattab took Sulaiman's sons under his care. However, instigated by Sulaiman's supporters, the sons killed al-Khattab in the year 1138. 

He was Dhu'ayb ibn Musa's principal aide and a warrior, poet and theologian.

Books
He authored theological works likeMuneerat ul Basaair and Ghayat ul Mawaleed. He has also written a collection of poems.

See also
 Dhu'ayb ibn Musa

Bibliography

References 

Yemeni Ismailis
Banu Hamdan
12th century in Yemen
1138 deaths
12th-century Ismailis
Tayyibi Isma'ilism